State Production Farms (abbreviated DÜÇ) is the name of a group of state owned farms in Turkey. They were founded on 1 March 1950 as a model to Turkish farmers. 
In 1984 they were reorganized within TIGEM, a subsidiary of the Ministry of Agriculture of Turkey. The names of the farms is as follows.

References

Farms in Turkey
1950 establishments in Turkey
Turkey-related lists